Moose Jaw is the fourth largest city in Saskatchewan, Canada. Residents of Moose Jaw are known as Moose Javians. The city is surrounded by the Rural Municipality of Moose Jaw No. 161.

Moose Jaw is an industrial centre and important railway junction for the area's agricultural produce. CFB Moose Jaw is a NATO flight training school, and is home to the Snowbirds, Canada's military aerobatic air show flight demonstration team. Moose Jaw also has a casino and geothermal spa.

History 
Cree and Assiniboine people used the Moose Jaw area as a winter encampment. The Missouri Coteau sheltered the valley and gave it warm breezes. The narrow river crossing and abundance of water and game made it a good location for settlement. Traditional native fur traders and Métis buffalo hunters created the first permanent settlement at a place called "the turn", at present-day Kingsway Park.

The confluence of the Moose Jaw River and Thunder Creek was chosen and registered in 1881 as a site for a division point for the Canadian Pacific Railway (CPR), whose construction was significant in the Confederation of Canada. The water supply there was significant for steam locomotives. Settlement began there in 1882 and the city was incorporated in 1903. The railways played an important role in the early development of Moose Jaw, with the city having both a Canadian Pacific Railway Station and a Canadian National Railway Station. A dam was built on the river in 1883 to create a year-round water supply.

Marked on a map as Moose Jaw Bone Creek in an 1857 survey by surveyor John Palliser, two theories exist as to how the city was named. The first is it comes from the Plains Cree name moscâstani-sîpiy meaning "a warm place by the river", indicative of the protection from the weather the Coteau range provides to the river valley containing the city and also the Plains Cree word moose gaw, meaning warm breezes. The other is that the section of the Moose Jaw River that runs through the city is shaped like a moose's jaw.

There is also an untrue story of the name being inspired by the Earl of Dunmore, for whom Dunmore, Alberta is named, repairing his cart with the jawbone of a moose during his travels there.

The city was the site of the 1954 mid-air collision of Trans-Canada Air Lines Flight 9.

Military presence 
The area surrounding Moose Jaw has a high number of cloudless days, making it a good site for training pilots. The Royal Canadian Air Force under the British Commonwealth Air Training Plan established RCAF Station Moose Jaw in 1940. After the war, the RCAF remained in the community and used the facility for training pilots through the Cold War. The facility changed its name to CFB Moose Jaw in 1968 and is now Canada's primary military flight training centre and the home of 431 (Air Demonstration) Squadron (aka the "Snowbirds").

CFB Moose Jaw's primary lodger unit is "15 Wing". In the Royal Canadian Air Force the lodger unit is often called 15 Wing Moose Jaw. The base usually holds an Armed Forces Day each year.

The Saskatchewan Dragoons are a reserve armoured regiment with an armoury in the city's north end.

Royal presence 

Moose Jaw has been visited by many members of the Royal Family. Edward, Prince of Wales, who owned a ranch in Pekisko, Alberta, visited in 1919, 1924, and 1927. Prince Albert, future king and father of Queen Elizabeth II, paid a visit in 1926. King George VI and his wife Queen Elizabeth (later known as Queen Elizabeth, the Queen Mother) visited during the Royal tour in 1939. Queen Elizabeth II first visited in 1959, and has come to the city a few times since.

The Earl of Wessex (Prince Edward) became Colonel-in-Chief of the Saskatchewan Dragoons of Moose Jaw on visiting Saskatchewan in 2003, when he congratulated the regiment on its "contribution to Canada's proud tradition of citizen-soldiers in the community." Involved in peacekeeping operations in Cyprus, the Golan Heights, Bosnia and Croatia, the regiment has also provided aid during floods and forest fires in the prairies. The Prince returned to visit his regiment in 2006.

The Earl of Wessex also inaugurated the Queen's Jubilee Rose Garden in Moose Jaw on his visit in 2003. Other royal connections to the city include King George School and Prince Arthur Community School, both named for members of the royal family. Before it shut down and became the separate Cornerstone Christian School, the South Hill school was formerly named King Edward Elementary School.

Climate
Moose Jaw's climate is transitional between semiarid and humid continental (Köppen BSk and Dfb, respectively). Moose Jaw's winters are long, cold and dry, while its summers are short, but very warm and relatively wet.

Government
Moose Jaw City Council consists of an elected mayor and 6 city councilors. From 1881 to 1903 the community was represented by a Town Council and thereafter by City Council.

Moose Jaw City Hall, on the 2nd floor at the old Moose Jaw Post Office (c. 1911), has been council's home since the late 1960s

Provincially the city is represented by two MLA and federally by one MP.

Neighbourhoods

Caribou Heights
Churchill Park
City View
Crescent View
Earnscliffe
Fairview
Grand View
Hill Crest
Iron Bridge
Kingsway Park
Lynbrook Heights
Mooscana
Morningside
New Currie
Palliser Heights
Parkdale Boulevard
Pleasant View
Prairie Heights
Old 96
Regal Heights
River Park
River View
Ross Park
Rothesay Park
Slater
Sunningdale
Sunnyside
Tapley
University
University Heights
Victoria Heights
Wellesley Park
WestHeath
Westmore
Westmount
West Park

These neighbourhoods are divided into four community associations: South Hill, East Side, North West and Sunningdale/VLA/West Park.

Demographics 

Economy

Moose Jaw is a city of 33,000 at the intersection of the Trans Canada Highway and Highway 2. A Snowbird aerobatic jet and Mac the Moose are large roadside attractions on the No. 1 highway at the tourist info center. Moose Jaw Trolley Company (1912) offers trolley tours of Moose Jaw. Temple Garden's Mineral Spa, Tunnels of Moose Jaw, and History of Transportation Western Development Museum. are major sites of interest. The juncture of Moose Jaw and Thunder Creek produced the best source of water for steam engines, and Moose Jaw became the CPR divisional point. Large-capacity concrete grain terminals are replacing the smaller grain elevators that were numerous along the highway, sentinels of most communities along the route. Improved technology for harvest, transport and road construction have made the large inland terminals more viable economically. The rural governing body around Moose Jaw is Moose Jaw No. 161, which serves 1,228 residents (2006 census) and includes the Moose Jaw Canadian Forces Base. Meat-processing plants, salt, potash, urea fertilizer, anhydrous ammonia and ethanol producers abound in this area with easy transport access to the Trans–Canada Highway.

In 1917 a group of local residents banded together to purchase enough automobile parts to build 25 cars. These were to be manufactured under the name Moose Jaw Standard. Each member of the group received a car, but no further buyers were found, and production did not continue.

Arts and culture

Visual Arts 
The Moose Jaw Art Guild is a community arts association made up of local artists dedicated to exhibiting, educating and fostering appreciation for visual arts.

Museums
Moose Jaw is home to one of four Saskatchewan Western Development Museums. The Moose Jaw WDM museum specializes in the history of transportation and has a Snowbirds gallery.

The Sukanen Ship Pioneer Village and Museum is south of Moose Jaw on Sk Hwy 2. The car club at Moose Jaw agreed to the restoration of Tom Sukanen's ship at their museum site. Sukanen was a Finnish homesteader who settled near Birsay and hoped to travel home again on a ship he assembled near the South Saskatchewan River. The Sukanen Ship Pioneer Village and Museum features a typical village replete with pioneer artifacts and tractors, cars and trucks restored by the Moose Jaw car club, and is run by volunteers.

The Moose Jaw Museum & Art Gallery is located in Crescent Park at the centre of the downtown area, in the same facility as the Moose Jaw Public Library. The art gallery hosts community exhibits, travelling exhibits, and rotating exhibits from the gallery's permanent collection. The museum also has a heritage gallery, which curates and hosts exhibits on local history, including an upcoming "Pandemic Time Capsule" exhibit scheduled for Spring 2021. The Museum & Art Gallery also hosts classes and events.

2SLGBTQ culture 
In 1978, Anita Bryant visited Moose Jaw as part of the anti-gay Save Our Children campaign. In response, approximately 85 lesbian and gay protesters marched down Main St. to Crescent Park, where an estimated 150 people gathered to speak out against Bryant.

In 2008, the Gay and Lesbian Association of Moose Jaw (GLAMj) requested and was granted the first official proclamation of Pride Week in Moose Jaw, and raised the Rainbow Flag over Moose Jaw's City Hall for the first time. The city's first pride parade since 1978 was held in 2015, and similar parades have been held annually in late May or early June, usually from Main Street to Crescent Park.

Moose Jaw Pride is an LGBT community organization that was incorporated as a non-profit organization in 2014. Moose Jaw Pride was a founding member of the Saskatchewan Pride Network, started in 2016, which serves to connect and support 2SLGBTQ people in small communities across Saskatchewan, many of which do not have an established local pride organization.

Since 2019, Moose Jaw Pride has been working with local partners to promote Moose Jaw as a safe and attractive tourism destination for 2SLGBTQ people. 2SLGBTQ tourist attractions include a rainbow-coloured bench on Main Street, in front of the Rainbow Retro Thrift Shop, and a mural on the back of the Rainbow Retro building that depicts events and symbols from local 2SLGBTQ history, including representations of the Anita Bryant march, the Indigenous two-spirit presence in Saskatchewan, the potluck and coffee social events that were central to 2SLGBTQ community development, and several landmark pride flag raisings.

Attractions
Tourist attractions include the Tunnels of Moose Jaw, The Moose Jaw Trolley, the Temple Gardens Mineral Spa Resort, The Western Development Museum, Casino Moose Jaw, Moose Jaw Museum and Art Gallery, Yvette Moore Art Gallery, the Murals of Moose Jaw, and the historic downtown. Every July the four-day Saskatchewan Festival of Words showcases top Canadian writers in a wide variety of genres. The weekend after Canada Day, the free three-day Sidewalk Days Festival draws tens of thousands to Main Street. The Snowbirds flight demonstration team is based at CFB Moose Jaw, south of Moose Jaw in Bushell Park, where the now defunct airshow was performed every summer. It will be brought back in 2019.

Moose Jaw has many parks. Crescent Park is located in downtown. It features a creek, picnic tables, library, art museum, playground, outdoor swimming pool, water park, tennis court, lawn bowling field and an amphitheatre. Casino Moose Jaw and Temple Gardens Mineral Spa are across Fairford St. E. and 1st Ave. NE. from Crescent Park. "Wakamow Park" follows the Moose Jaw River and features both natural and maintained areas. There are many trails throughout the park for hiking and cycling as well as picnic tables, barbecues, a burger restaurant and two playgrounds. There is also an RV park, known as River Park Campground, which was founded in 1927 and is the longest-running campground in North America. Canoe and kayak rentals are available across the road from the campground. The Moose Jaw Canoe and Kayak Club has been around since the late '90s and is inside the campground.

Old Wives Lake, a saline lake is 30 km southwest of the city on Highway 363. Buffalo Pound Lake a eutrophic prairie lake is 28 km north on Highway 2 and is the city's water supply. Buffalo Pound Provincial Park is on the south shore and can be accessed by Highway 202 and Highway 301.

Tunnels of Moose Jaw 

The tunnels present two tour attractions: Passage to Fortune and The Chicago Connection. While Passage to Fortune is construed by many visitors to be historically accurate, there is no evidence to suggest that Chinese Canadians lived in the tunnels of the tours outside of minimal anecdotal testimonies. Historically accurate information such as the Chinese Exclusion Act, Chinese Head Tax and the case of Quong Wing v R which occurred at the site of 1 Main street across the location of the tunnels are mentioned throughout the tour. However, Passage to Fortune also circulates misinformation about Chinese Canadians in Moose Jaw. Moose Jaw Tour attendees are called "Coolies" at an early stage of the tour. Tour attendees are then guided through the tunnels from the position of Chinese workers indentured to the fictional laundry owner Mr. Burrows who were forced to live underground. In actuality, early Chinese Canadians were often proprietors of their own laundries, a labor-intensive industry many found themselves in due to prejudice barring them from entering other industries. In 1890, the first Chinese business opened in Moose Jaw, was a Chinese laundry. in 1908, nine laundries can be found in the City directory, with eight businesses notably Chinese-run.

The tunnels became a hub of renewed activity in the 1920s for rum-running during Prohibition in the United States. They were reported to have warehoused illegal alcohol that was shipped to the U.S. via the Soo Line Railroad. The tunnels were also used for gambling and prostitution, all without interference from the corrupt police. There has long been anecdotal evidence that American mobster Al Capone visited Moose Jaw or had interests in the bootlegging operations. No written or photographic proof exists of Capone's presence, but several firsthand accounts from Moose Javians who claim to have met him have been documented. Capone's grandniece also confirmed he had been in Moose Jaw before his 1931 conviction for tax evasion. In the 21st century, the city capitalized on this notoriety to restore the tunnel network into the Tunnels of Moose Jaw, a tourist attraction that opened in June 2000. The Royal Canadian Mounted Police, however, states that there is no "evidence that he ever set foot on Canadian soil."

Sports and recreation 
As in most Canadian cities, hockey has played a large part in Moose Jaw's sporting culture. Baseball has also been an important part of Moose Jaw since its first days; the city won the territorial championship in 1895. Most recently, the 2004 Junior All-Star team (age 13/14) won the Canadian Championship and became the first team from Saskatchewan to win a game at the Little League World Series.

Notable Moose Jaw teams include:
 Moose Jaw Warriors, Western Hockey League team
Moose Jaw Storm, Division 2 Soccer team
 Moose Jaw Miller Express, Western Major Baseball League team
 Moose Jaw Mustangs, Prairie Gold Lacrosse League team
 Moose Jaw Rotary Track Club, Track and Field and cross country club
 Lil Chicago Roller Derby's Moose Jaw Jaw Breakers - Women's Flat Track Roller Derby
 Moose Jaw Chiefs, Prairie Gold Lacrosse League Senior team
Defunct sports teams
 Moose Jaw Robin Hoods, senior hockey team and Western Canada League baseball team (1909–21)
 Moose Jaw Maple Leafs, senior hockey team (1919–1923)
 Moose Jaw Maroons, Prairie Hockey League team (1926–28)
 Moose Jaw Canucks, Saskatchewan Junior Hockey League team (1935–1984)
 Moose Jaw Generals, senior hockey team, winner of the Hardy Cup in 1985
 Moose Jaw Diamond Dogs, Prairie League baseball team (1995–1997)
 Moose Jaw Millers, Saskatchewan Rugby Football Union (Canadian football) team (? – c. 1941)

Education
Local institutions include five high schools and 15 elementary schools. The schools are in the Prairie South School Division and the Holy Trinity Catholic Schools.

École Ducharme offers preschool to grade 12 and is Moose Jaw's only Francophone school. 
École fransaskoise de Moose Jaw offers French Immersion from preschool to grade 9.

Moose Jaw is also home to a campus of Saskatchewan Polytechnic.

Infrastructure

Health care 
Moose Jaw Union Hospital, part of the Five Hills Health Region, was the main health care provider for the city since 1948, but closed in 2015 and was replaced by Dr. F.H. Wigmore Regional Hospital in the city's northeast end. The new location was picked in part for its proximity to the Trans-Canada Highway. The Wigmore Hospital uses LEAN methodology to save time and money in healthcare.

Security 
The Moose Jaw Fire Department (est. 1906) is a 57-member fire and rescue service that provides fire suppression to the city and CFB Moose Jaw. It has two stations, North Hill Fire Station (Headquarters) and South Hill Fire Station. It is also contracted out to CFB Moose Jaw to provide structural fire suppression services.

Ambulatory (EMS) services is provided by Five Hills Health Region, which operates an EMS station in Moose Jaw; non-emergency services are provided by St. John Ambulance.

The Moose Jaw Police Service provide policing with 54 sworn members for the city and hold both municipal and provincial jurisdiction, in partnership with the Royal Canadian Mounted Police.

Transportation 

Moose Jaw Transit provides local bus service to urban areas of the city. This small system operates four routes from a downtown hub on weekdays between 7:15am and 9:45pm and on Saturdays from 7:15am to 6:15pm, with no Sunday or holiday service.

The bus fleet was replaced in 2008 by new low-floor accessible vehicles, under the federal government's one-time public transit capital funding program.

CFB Moose Jaw's airfield is also used by civilian aircraft, with civilian operations at the base referring to the facility as Moose Jaw/Air Vice Marshal C.M. McEwen Airport.

Moose Jaw has four photo radar cameras, including two which operate on the TransCanada Highway passing through the city.

Media
Print
Moose Jaw Express, With two publications, a local weekly newspaper and a Weekend edition

Radio
800 AM — CHAB, oldies (800 CHAB), Golden West Broadcasting
100.7 FM — CILG-FM, country music (Country 100), Golden West Broadcasting
103.9 FM — CJAW-FM, adult contemporary (Mix 103), Golden West Broadcasting
Moose Jaw's Rock Station The Buzz, The Buzz Digital Radio Network, Digital Radio Broadcaster, Active Rock,(TheBuzzRocks.ca), Pearl Creek Media

Television
SNN : Moose Jaw, Saskatchewan News Network Digital TV Broadcaster, Local & Provincial News,(SaskNews.net), Pearl Creek Media
The only terrestrial broadcast television station local to Moose Jaw is CKMJ-TV channel 7, an analogue repeater of CTV station CKCK-DT Regina. Moose Jaw was previously served by CHAB-TV, a television station that existed from 1959 to 1969.
In the Series pilot for Due South, it is revealed that the character Benton Fraser once worked in Moose Jaw.
In the Animated Series Atomic Betty, this city is where it is set under the name of "Moose Jaw Heights"

Notable people

 Siera Bearchell, Miss Universe Canada 2016 Born and raised in Moose Jaw. 
 J. G. Ballard, English novelist and short story writer
 Randy Black, former drummer for Primal Fear and Annihlator
 Mike Blaisdell, former National Hockey League player
 Ray Boughen, former mayor, former Member of Parliament for the riding of Palliser
 Lorne Calvert, Premier of Saskatchewan (2001–2007)
 Earl Cameron (broadcaster)
 Roger Carter, former Dean of the University of Saskatchewan College of Law; born in Moose Jaw.
 Dana Claxton (filmmaker, photographer, performance artist)
 Reggie Cleveland, World Series-starting baseball pitcher
 Ben Coakwell, Canadian Olympic bobsledder
 Burton Cummings, musician
 Bill Davies, former MLA for Moose Jaw, member of the Order of Canada
 Scott Deibert, former Canadian football player
 Phyllis Dewar, Olympic swimmer
 Ken Doraty, former National Hockey League player
 Emile Francis, former National Hockey League player and coach
 Lisa Franks, Paralympic athlete
 Clark Gillies, former National Hockey League player
 Peter Gzowski resided in Moose Jaw in 1957
 Adam Hadwin, professional golfer
 Ken Kelly, Paralympic athlete and silver medal winner (1996 Atlanta Games) 
 Roy Kiyooka, Canadian Poet
 Joy Kogawa, author and poet
 Bill Lesuk, played in the NHL for the Boston Bruins, Philadelphia Flyers, Los Angeles Kings, Washington Capitals, and in the WHA with the Winnipeg Jets
 Art Linkletter, radio and television host of Art Linkletter's House Party
 Reed Low, former National Hockey League player
 Bud McCaig, co-owner of the Calgary Flames
 Mike Mintenko, Olympic swimmer
 David Mitchell, National Lacrosse League player
 Ken Mitchell, author, member of the Order of Canada
 Scott Munroe, American Hockey League player
 Fergie Olver, Toronto Blue Jays broadcaster
 Jack Reddick, Canadian Light Heavyweight Champion boxer
 Chico Resch, former National Hockey League goalie
 Arthur Slade, Governor General's Award-winning author
 Doug Smail, former National Hockey League player
 Levi Steinhauer, CFL player
 George Swarbrick, former National Hockey League player
 Ross Thatcher, former Premier Province of Saskatchewan (1964–1971).
 Geoffrey Ursell, writer
 Glen Sonmor, former NHL coach.

See also

Monarchy in Saskatchewan
Wakamow Valley Authority

References

Explanatory notes

Further reading
Earl of Wessex Visits Saskatchewan Regiment (2003)
Racist and other organized criminal organizations in Moose Jaw

External links

 
1903 establishments in the Northwest Territories
Cities in Saskatchewan
Populated places established in 1903
Division No. 7, Saskatchewan